Bishkek-1 is a train station located in the western part of Bishkek, Kyrgyzstan. Bishkek-2 railway station is located in the city center, while this station is located western part of the city.

Trains
 Bishkek — Novokuznetsk
 Bishkek — Shu

See also

Kyrgyz Railways
Bishkek-2 railway station

References

Railway stations in Kyrgyzstan
Buildings and structures in Bishkek